Derbent is a village in the Bayat District, Afyonkarahisar Province, Turkey. Its population is 1,093 (2021).

References

Villages in Bayat District, Afyonkarahisar